Eliezer Preminger (13 April 1920 – 15 September 2001) was an Israeli politician who served as a member of the Knesset for Maki, the Hebrew Communists and Mapam between 1949 and 1951.

Biography
Born in Vienna in 1920, Preminger made aliyah to Mandatory Palestine in 1939.

He joined the Palestine Communist Party, but in 1945 was one of the leaders of a group that left in order to form the  Hebrew Communists party. In 1948 he joined Maki, and was  elected to the first Knesset in 1949 on the party's list. During his period in the Knesset, Preminger held the following functions: Chair, Subcommittee on Distribution of Raw Materials, Observer, Constitution, Law and Justice Committee, Member of Economic Affairs Committee,  Constitution, Law and Justice Committee,  Committee for Public Services. Following a purge of Maki's leadership, Preminger left the party and resurrected the Hebrew Communists party on 8 June 1949. On 15 August 1949, he joined Mapam. He lost his seat in the 1951 elections, and later worked as Deputy Director General of the Ministry of Development, as well as serving on the board of directors of Israel Quarries and the Phosphates Company.

References

External links

1920 births
2001 deaths
Jewish emigrants from Austria to Mandatory Palestine after the Anschluss
Jewish socialists
Leaders of political parties in Israel
Israeli civil servants
Mapam politicians
Maki (historical political party) politicians
Hebrew Communists politicians
Members of the 1st Knesset (1949–1951)